The Historiographer Royal is a member of the Royal household of Scotland. The office was created in 1681, and was in abeyance from 1709 until 1763 when it was revived for Principal William Robertson of the University of Edinburgh.

The post, which now has no formal responsibilities or salary, is appointed by the Sovereign by Letters Patent passed under the Great Seal of Scotland. 

The current office-holder is Christopher Smout, Emeritus Professor of History at the University of St Andrews.

Office Holders 

Holders of the office  are:

James Crawford DD: 11 Nov 1681
William Turner DD: 30 Sep 1682
James Fall: 16 Dec 1682
Christopher Irving MD: 30 July 1686
William Dunlop: 31 Jan 1693
Daniel Campbell: 1 April 1700
David Crawford jr of Drumsoy: 5 Oct 1704
David Sympsone: 12 May 1708 – 4 July 1709
Office vacant from 1709 until 1763
Rev William Robertson DD: 6 Aug 1763
John Gillies LLD: 15 Jun 1793
George Brodie: 5 Mar 1836
John Hill Burton LLD: 29 Aug 1867
William Forbes Skene DCL LLD: 14 Nov 1881
David Masson LLD: 3 Mar 1893
Peter Hume Brown: 4 May 1908
Sir Robert Sangster Rait CBE MA: 11 Jan 1919
Robert Kerr Hannay LLD FRSE: 14 July 1930
Henry William Meikle MA DLitt: 23 Sep 1940
J. D. Mackie OBE MC LLD: 19 Sep 1958 – 1978
Gordon Donaldson CBE: 1979–1993
Christopher Smout CBE: 1993–

References

Lists of office-holders in Scotland
Historiography of Scotland
Scottish royalty
Positions within the British Royal Household
1681 establishments in Scotland